Nikolaos Lazarou (born 6 August 1942) is a Greek wrestler. He competed in the men's Greco-Roman 63 kg at the 1968 Summer Olympics.

References

1942 births
Living people
Greek male sport wrestlers
Olympic wrestlers of Greece
Wrestlers at the 1968 Summer Olympics
Place of birth missing (living people)
20th-century Greek people